Deh Bozorg or Deh-e Bozorg (meaning "big village") may refer to:
Deh-e Bozorg, Isfahan
Deh Bozorg, Kohgiluyeh and Boyer-Ahmad
Deh-e Bozorg-e Firuzabad, Kohgiluyeh and Boyer-Ahmad Province
Deh Bozorg-e Pereshkaft, Kohgiluyeh and Boyer-Ahmad Province
Deh Bozorg-e Sisakht, Kohgiluyeh and Boyer-Ahmad Province
Deh Bozorg, alternate name of Darreh Goru Firuzabad, Kohgiluyeh and Boyer-Ahmad Province
Deh Bozorg, alternate name of Azizabad-e Qeytasvand, Lorestan Province
Deh-e Bozorg, Pol-e Dokhtar, Lorestan Province
Deh-e Bozorg, Mamulan, Lorestan Province